Angulyagra microchaetophora is a species of freshwater snail with a gill and an operculum, an aquatic gastropod mollusk in the family Viviparidae.

Distribution 
This species is found in Assam, Manipur and Nagaland states in India.

References

External links 

Viviparidae